What Doesn't Kill You is a 2008 American crime drama loosely based on the true life story of the film's director Brian Goodman, detailing his own exploits involved with South Boston's Irish Mob. Starring Ethan Hawke and Mark Ruffalo, it premiered at the 2008 Toronto International Film Festival, and was released on a very small scale in December 2008 due to the collapse of its distributor Yari Film Group. The title alludes to the Nietzsche quote  (What does not kill me makes me stronger).

Premise
Hawke and Ruffalo play childhood friends Paulie and Brian, who are forced to survive on the tough streets of South Boston through a life of petty thievery. They join a local gang of criminals, but Brian finds it hard to reconcile his work and friendship with Paulie and his relationship with his wife (Amanda Peet) and sons.

Cast
 Mark Ruffalo as Brian Reilly
 Ethan Hawke as Paulie McDougan
 Amanda Peet as Stacy Reilly
 Will Lyman as Sully
 Brian Goodman as Pat Kelly
 Donnie Wahlberg as Detective Moran
 Angela Featherstone as Katie
 Brian Connolly as Sean
 Lindsey McKeon as Nicole
 Eddie J Fernandez as Swat team leader 1
 Michael Yebba as Round Man
 Michael Elian as FBI/HRT Swat sniper team 1
 Brett G Smith as FBI/HRT Swat commander 
 Max Martini as FBI/HRT Swat (M4 Carbine)
 Candice Accola as teenage hostage
 Rich Skinner as Chappy

Reception
On Rotten Tomatoes the film has an approval rating of 65% based on 34 reviews. On Metacritic the film has a score of 71 out of 100 based on reviews from 10 critics, indicating "generally favorable reviews".

References

External links
 
 
 
 

2008 films
2008 crime drama films
2008 directorial debut films
2000s heist films
American crime drama films
American heist films
Crime films based on actual events
Films about the Irish Mob
Films scored by Alex Wurman
Films set in Boston
Films shot in Massachusetts
2000s English-language films
Films directed by Brian Goodman
2000s American films